Lustrum (plural lustra) was a term for a five-year period in Ancient Rome.

Lustrum may also refer to:

Lustrum (novel), a novel by Robert Harris in his trilogy about Cicero
Lustrum (journal), a review journal for classical studies